The 1974 Princeton Tigers football team was an American football team that represented Princeton University during the 1974 NCAA Division I football season. Princeton tied for fifth in the Ivy League.

In their second year under head coach Robert Casciola, the Tigers compiled a 4–4–1 record and outscored opponents 188 to 160. Thomas H. Schalch was the team captain.

Princeton's 3–4 conference record tied for fifth in the Ivy League standings. The Tigers outscored Ivy opponents 149 to 130.

Princeton played its home games at Palmer Stadium on the university campus in Princeton, New Jersey.

Schedule

References

Princeton
Princeton Tigers football seasons
Princeton Tigers football